The Brothers of the Sacred Heart is a Catholic lay religious congregation of Pontifical Right for Men founded by the Reverend Fr. André Coindre (1787–1826) in 1821. Its Constitution was modeled upon that of the Jesuits, while its Rule of Life was based upon the Rule of Saint Augustine. Its members bind themselves for life by simple vows of religion. Its members add the nominal S.C. after their names to indicate their membership in the congregation.

There are only a few ordained members in the Congregation, the vast majority of its members being lay brothers, who live in community in accordance with the congregation's Rule of Life. Though the objective purpose of the congregation has evolved slightly over the years, its fundamental mission remains centered on the education of the young: in asylums, parochial and select schools, and colleges.

History

Foundations
André Coindre was a survivor of the chaos created in French society by the Reign of Terror at the end of the French Revolution. Though only a child at the time, out of this experience, he became committed to providing the moral, intellectual and religious development of the many boys left orphaned by the upheavals of this era. As a young man, Coindre entered the seminary of the Diocese of Lyon, France, and eventually was ordained as a secular priest of the diocese. During his period of preparation for his ministry, he came to envision men and women trained to work with the poor through education.

The first steps toward a concrete expression of this vision took place with his participation in the foundation in 1815 of the Religious of Jesus and Mary by St. Claudine Thévenet, the daughter of a merchant in the silk trade, for which Lyon had become noted. Like Coindre, Thévenet had survived the horrors of the late Revolutionary period. 

Under the guidance of Abbé Coindre, whom she had taken as her spiritual director, she gathered friends around her to offer shelter and basic education for poor girls, whom she considered the "weakest, the most shameful, the most deprived" of post-Revolutionary French society. As foundress of her Congregation, she became known as Mother Mary St. Ignatius, and was canonized by Pope John Paul II in 1983.

The establishment of the Brothers
In 1818 Coindre established an orphanage and trade school for homeless boys. His vision finally became a reality with the admission of the first group of men to a new foundation of Brothers in 1821, with Coindre himself acting as the Superior of the community, while remaining a secular priest attached to the Diocese. The direct administration of the lives of the Brothers was left to Brother Borgia, who acted as the Director of the Institute.

The early growth of the Congregation was slow. At the period of its origin the social and political conditions in France, still undergoing huge upheavals from the Revolution, was very unfavorable to the growth of religious communities. Lyon, the cradle of the congregation, suffered sorely in these tumultuous early revolutionary days. However, a greater impediment to its growth lay in the ill-defined system of government under which Coindre oversaw the Congregation. When the Brothers requested that he give them a definite Rule, as he had done for the Sisters, his response was:

Coindre's body was found on 20 May 1826 in Blois, where he was assigned at the time as Senior Vicar of the Diocese. For various reasons, there was long held some suspicion that his sudden and unexpected death might have been a suicide. There is evidence, though, that he was one of a number of the local clergy who were victims of an outbreak of acute meningitis. One consequence of this shadow regarding his death was that the first Superior General of the Institute rarely referred to him or his teachings. Following his death, his brother, the Reverend François Coindre, his cousin, succeeded him in the office of Superior.

The Congregation takes root
In 1840, François Coindre assembled the first General Chapter of the Congregation. During the discussions of the Chapter, opinion among the Brothers was unanimous that it was necessary for the success of the Congregation that its affairs be in the hands of the Brothers themselves, and that one of their number should be Superior General. The question was referred to Cardinal de Bonald, the Archbishop of Lyon, who, after an exhaustive examination, judged it advisable that Coindre should resign the office. On 13 September 1841, Brother Polycarp was unanimously chosen by the Brothers as their first Superior General.

The Brother went on to reconstruct the government of the Institute and gave it stability and permanency. He is considered their Second Founder among the Brothers, and his cause for canonization has been proceeding since 1902. In February 1984, Brother Polycarp was declared Venerable by Pope John Paul II.

Expansion
At the time of the Venerable Polycarp's death in 1859, there were over 400 Brothers in France alone staffing some 70 schools, an increase of sixty during his leadership. He had, moreover, at the invitation of Bishop Michael Portier of the Diocese of New Orleans, extended their presence to the United States, a new field of labor for the Institute, at Mobile, Alabama. The first Brothers arrived there in January 1847. Within twenty-five years, the Brothers in the United States had grown to such an extent that they were established as a separate Province of the Congregation. 1854-2004

In 1854 the Brothers of the Sacred Heart established St. Stanislaus College in Bay Saint Louis Mississippi. St. Stanislaus is the oldest institution of learning on the Mississippi Gulf Coast. Chartered in 1870 as St. Stanislaus College, the school became a college preparatory in 1923. In over 150 years the Brothers and faculty at St. Stanislaus have trained more than 10,000 young men in the principles of Christian doctrine and education.

In September 1869, the Brothers founded St. Aloysius High School in the French Quarter of New Orleans. This school merged with Cor Jesu High School in 1969 to form Brother Martin High School, which still serves the youth of that city.

In 1872, the Province of the United States extended its schools into Canada, and in 1880 transferred its novitiate from Indianapolis to Arthabaskaville (Arthabaska), in 1894, the brothers founded St Vincent Academy (now known as Catholic High School) a 6 time blue ribbon school winner, in Baton Rouge, Louisiana. in Quebec, Canada. In 1895, four Brothers were sent to Hawaii to help care for the healthy sons of lepers quarantined on the island of Molokai, which was an outgrowth of the labors of the recently deceased Apostle to the Lepers, Father Damien, SS.CC., now known as Saint Damien of Molokai.

The growth of the Congregation in Canada was so rapid, that, by the end of the 19th century, it was deemed advisable to erect the establishments in Canada into a separate Province. This was effected by a decree of the General Chapter of the Society held at Paradis, near Le Puy-en-Velay, France, in 1900. About that same time, both a House of Studies for postulants and a novitiate for the United States Province were established at Metuchen, New Jersey.

Not unlike many other religious communities in the Catholic Church, the Congregation saw a tremendous surge in vocations just prior to the Second Vatican Council. However, as with other groups, a substantial number of these men subsequently left the Institute. Africa and South America remain the two regions where vocations to the Institute are at their highest.

The Congregation holds that its founder, Andre Coindre, preached and acted upon the spirit of compassion that Jesus Christ exemplified through his own life. By responding to the abandoned youth in the city of Lyon, Coindre gave of himself, of his own heart. The Brothers of the Sacred Heart are called to respond just as did Coindre, just as Jesus did. This spirit of compassion is what motivates the Brothers today.

Current status
As of 2010, there are some 1,200 Brothers of the Sacred Heart serving in 32 countries. They have institutions throughout Europe and Africa, and in both North America and South America, as well as in the Philippines and Madagascar in the Pacific Ocean.

The address of the General Motherhouse of the Congregation is: Piazza del Sacro Cuore, No. 3, 00151 Rome, Italy.

References

External links 
 The Institute
 Province of Canada
 Province of Eastern and Southern Africa
 Argentina
 Province of Brazil
 Spain

Religious organizations established in 1821
Catholic religious institutes established in the 19th century
Catholic teaching orders
Institutes of Catholic religious brothers
1821 establishments in France